At least three ships of the Hellenic Navy have borne the name Salamis, after the Greek island of Salamis and the Battle of Salamis:
 , a battleship ordered from Germany in 1912 and launched in 1914,. She was never delivered and was scrapped incomplete in 1932.
She was returned to the Royal Navy in 1951 and scrapped.
 , a  launched in 1996.

Hellenic Navy ship names